Te Papapa Onehunga Rugby Football & Sports Club is a rugby union club based in Auckland, New Zealand. The club was established in 1944 and is affiliated with the Auckland Rugby Football Union. In addition to rugby union, the club is also active in netball, touch rugby, squash, darts, indoor bowls and cricket. At senior level, the club fields several teams, including Premier and Reserve grade sides, through a joint venture with Mt Wellington.

External links
Club website
Auckland RFU club profile

Sport in Auckland
New Zealand rugby union teams